Artists is a 1928 German silent film directed by Géza von Bolváry and starring Gyula Szőreghy, Anton Edthofer, and John Mylong.

Cast

References

Bibliography

External links

1928 films
Films of the Weimar Republic
German silent feature films
Films directed by Géza von Bolváry
Circus films
Films with screenplays by Franz Schulz
German black-and-white films